The Shire of Avon was a local government area about  north of Sale, the major regional centre in central Gippsland, Victoria, Australia.

History

Avon was first incorporated as a road district on 13 September 1864, and became a shire on 10 October 1865. On 27 May 1914 and 1 October 1964, it annexed parts of the Shire of Bairnsdale, and on 2 May 1917, it annexed part of the eastern riding of the Shire of Maffra. During 1966 and 1967, parts of its area were annexed to the City of Sale.

On 2 December 1994, the Shire of Avon was abolished, and along with the City of Sale, the Shires of Alberton and Maffra and parts of the Shire of Rosedale, was merged into the newly created Shire of Wellington.

Wards

The Shire of Avon was divided into three ridings, each of which elected three councillors:
 South Riding
 Central Riding
 North Riding

Towns and localities

* Council seat.

Population

* Estimate in the 1958 Victorian Year Book.

References

External links
 Victorian Places - Avon Shire

Avon